BCT may refer to:

Boca Raton Airport (IATA: BCT), in Palm Beach County, Florida
Baire category theorem, a result from general topology
Banque Centrale de Tunisie, Tunisia
Basic Cadet Training, initial military training for new cadets at the United States Air Force Academy
Basic Combat Training
Bat Conservation Trust, a British charity
Box compression test, a measure in corrugated fiber board packaging design and testing
Brigade combat team, the basic deployable unit of maneuver in the United States Army
Broward County Transit, a Fort Lauderdale-based system of public transportation
Bucks County Transport, bus transportation organization in Pennsylvania 
Buffalo Central Terminal, a railroad station located in Buffalo, New York
BC Transit, the company responsible for public transit in most of British Columbia
 Body Centered Tetragonal, a type of crystal structure, see Tetragonal crystal system
 Business Chinese Test, see 
 Bad Compilation Tapes, an independent punk/hardcore music label